The Graduate Live (ザ グラジュレイト ライブ) is a live album by Carlos Toshiki & Omega Tribe released by Warner Pioneer on April 10, 1991. The album charted at No. 54 on the Oricon charts.

Background 
On December 14, 1990, the band had announced their plans for disbandment after performing their first single "Kimi wa 1000%" on the Japanese television program Music Station. From February 21, 1991 to March 16, 1991, the band held a final tour, ending at Nissin Power Station, with the album was recorded on the first day at Shibuya Public Hall. The album was released with 2 CDs.

Track listing

Charts

References 

1991 live albums
Omega Tribe (Japanese band) albums